Alice Amter (born 11 May 1966)  is an English actress, best known for her character Mrs. Koothrappali in the American sitcom The Big Bang Theory and Dr. Kapoor on Hot in Cleveland.

Early life and education 
Born Alice Edwards, she grew up in Handsworth before moving to Edgbaston, Leamington Spa and Rubery. Whilst living in Leamington Spa, she spent time in a children's home in Warwick New Road. Her single German mother later cared for her. Amter attended Milverton Junior and Infant School and she received a Bachelor of Arts in modern languages and international relations from the University of Wolverhampton.

Career 
She has lived in France, Germany, Japan (where she taught English in the early 1990s), and the United States. She moved to Los Angeles, California in the early 1990s. Despite her best-known role as "Mrs. Koothrappali", she has said she has no Indian ancestry.

Filmography

Film

Television

References

1966 births
Living people
English film actresses
English television actresses
English people of German descent
British expatriate actresses in the United States
Actresses from Birmingham, West Midlands
Alumni of the University of Wolverhampton
People from Handsworth, West Midlands
20th-century English actresses
21st-century English actresses